Tamara Drewe is a weekly comic strip serial by Posy Simmonds, which had a 13 month run in The Guardians Review section. The strip is based upon a modern reworking of Thomas Hardy's 1874 novel Far from the Madding Crowd. 

The story was adapted into a feature film starring Gemma Arterton.

Plot

The story is set in Stonefield, a writer's retreat run by Beth and Nicholas Hardiman, where the novelist Glen Larson stays to find inspiration for his latest novel. Tamara Drewe, a young gossip columnist, has returned to her family home nearby. Her sexy looks have every man in the vicinity falling for her. When she has a relationship with rockstar Ben Sergeant she unknowingly infatuates two teenage girlfriends, Casey and Jody, who start to intermingle with her affairs.

Publication history
The strip made its first appearance in The Guardian on 17 September 2005, in the first Berliner-sized Saturday edition.

Collected editions
The complete work was published as a single volume with hardcover (Jonathan Cape, November 2007) and softcover editions (Mariner Books, October 2008, ; Jonathan Cape, September 2009). It has also been translated into French (Editions Denoël, October 2008), German (Reprodukt, January 2010), and Swedish (Wibom books, October 2011).

Awards
Tamara Drewe won the 2009 Prix de la critique.

Film adaptation

The comic has been adapted into a feature film starring Gemma Arterton and Dominic Cooper and directed by Stephen Frears.  Momentum Pictures released the film in the UK on 10 September 2010. The film premièred at the Cannes Film Festival in May 2010

References 

2005 comics debuts
2007 comics endings
British comic strips
British comics adapted into films
Drewe, Tamara
Drewe, Tamara
Drama comics
Drewe, Tamara
Drewe, Tamara
Romance comics
Slice of life comics
Adaptations of works by Thomas Hardy